Bronco Buster is a 1952 American Western film directed by Budd Boetticher and starring John Lund, Scott Brady and Joyce Holden. It was produced and distributed by Universal Pictures.

Plot
A veteran rodeo rider takes on a young apprentice in order to "teach him the ropes" and winds up competing against him.

Cast
 John Lund as Tom Moody 
 Scott Brady as Bart Eaton 
 Joyce Holden as Judy Bream
 Chill Wills as Dan Bream
 Don Haggerty as Dobie Carson
 Casey Tibbs as Rodeo Rider
 Pete Crump as Rodeo Rider 
 Dan Poore as Dick Elliot
 Bill Williams as Rodeo Rider
 Jerry Ambler as Rodeo Rider

See also
 List of American films of 1952

References

External links
 
 
 

1952 films
American Western (genre) films
1950s English-language films
1952 Western (genre) films
Films directed by Budd Boetticher
1950s American films